Senator Camp may refer to:

David M. Camp (1788–1871), Vermont State Senate
John Lafayette Camp (1828–1891), Texas State Senate
John Lafayette Camp Jr. (1855–1918), Texas State Senate